Garner Creek is a stream in Hickman and Dickson counties, Tennessee, in the United States.

According to tradition, Garner Creek was named from an incident when Colonel William Garner fell into the creek while crossing it, and later settled there.

See also
List of rivers of Tennessee

References

Rivers of Dickson County, Tennessee
Rivers of Hickman County, Tennessee
Rivers of Tennessee